Leioheterodon geayi, commonly known as the Madagascan speckled hognose snake, the speckled hognose snake or Geay's hognose snake, is a species of mildly venomous snake in the family Lamprophiidae. The species is native to southwestern Madagascar.

Etymology
The specific name, geayi, is in honor of French naturalist Martin François Geay (1859-1910) who collected the type specimen.

Description

It is an opisthoglyphous ("rear-fanged") snake, having a pair of enlarged teeth at the rear of each maxilla (upper jaw).

References

Further reading
Glaw F, Vences M (1994). A Fieldguide to the Amphibians and Reptiles of Madagascar, Second Edition. Cologne, Germany: Vences & Glaw Verlag/Serpents Tale. 480 pp. .
Mocquard F (1905). "Description de deux nouvelles espèces de Reptiles ". Bulletin du Muséum national d'histoire naturelle de Paris 11: 288-290. (Lioheterodon [sic] geayi, new species, pp. 289–290). (in French).

Pseudoxyrhophiidae
Taxa named by François Mocquard
Reptiles described in 1905